Martje Venter Hospital is a Provincial government funded hospital for the Enoch Mgijima Local Municipality area in Tarkastad in South Africa.

The hospital departments include Emergency department, Out Patients Department, Paediatric ward, Maternity ward, Surgical Services, Medical Services, Operating Theatre & CSSD Services, Pharmacy, Anti-Retroviral (ARV) treatment for HIV/AIDS, VCT, Laundry Services, Kitchen Services and Mortuary.

References 
 Martje Venter Hospital

Hospitals in the Eastern Cape
Enoch Mgijima Local Municipality